Tech Bureau, Corp. is an internet and software development company based in Nishi-ku, Osaka, Japan.

Services

Zaif 
Zaif is a cryptocurrency exchange that handles currencies including Bitcoin, Bitcoin Cash and Monacoin. As of September 2018, it was ranked as the 35th largest cryptocurrency exchange by turnover, and was one of sixteen cryptocurrency exchanges licensed and regulated by the Japanese Financial Services Agency (FSA). 

On September 14, 2018, the exchange was hacked and the equivalent of $60 million in cryptocurrency was stolen. The hackers reportedly gained access to "hot wallets" through which the exchange held funds for immediate transactions. Tech Bureau said that it did not notice the breach until Monday, September 17, and that the breach was then promptly reported to police and the FSA. The hack resulted in a suspension of withdrawals and deposits, and a bailout agreement with FISCO, a Japanese company that injected 5 billion yen in financial support to Tech Bureau.

References

External links 

 Official website

Financial services companies established in 2014
Digital currency exchanges
Bitcoin exchanges
Online companies of Japan
Internet technology companies of Japan
Cryptocurrency theft